Dniprovsky Metallurgical Plant or Dnipro Metallurgical Plant is a private joint-stock company and the oldest metallurgical enterprise in the city of Dnipro. It is located in the Novokodatskyi District, in  Dnipro Raion. It was founded in 1885.

Until 1917, the plant was called the Alexander Southern Russian Ironworks and Rolling Mill of the Bryansk Joint-Stock Company. The plant was named after Emperor Alexander III. Later the plant was known as the Bryansk Plant. From 1922 until the time of decommunization in Ukraine, the plant was named after the Bolshevik figure Hryhoriy Petrovsky.

The main products are square billets (supplied to Egypt) and structural channel beams which have a wide export geography (supplied to European, Asian, and African countries).

References

Companies established in 1885
Steel companies of Ukraine
Companies based in Dnipro